Collins Mbesuma (born 3 February 1984) is a Zambian professional footballer who plays for South African club Pretoria Callies. He is nicknamed The Hurricane or Ntofontofo.

Club career
Mbesuma was born in Luanshya. His father, Francis Kajiya, was also a football player who played as a midfielder for Zambian clubs; Green Buffaloes FC and Ndola United FC as well as the country's national team from the late 1970s to the early 1980s.

The surname "Mbesuma" is adopted from his step father who raised him as he was not brought up by his biological father Kajiya.

Mbesuma made his debut for Zambia in 2003 and had won four caps by the end of that year, while at the same time being a key member of Zambia's under-23 side that almost qualified for the Athens Olympics.

His performances for the Olympic team caught the attention of Kaizer Chiefs who bought him in January from Roan United in Zambia, where he averaged a goal every other game.

He scored on his debut in South Africa's Premier Soccer League in 2004 against the Black Leopards but injured himself in the process and spent several weeks on the sidelines.

Mbesuma was named PSL Player of the Season in 2005 after scoring a sensational 35 goals in one season with Kaizer Chiefs. After such an achievement a move to a more prestigious league looked assured, and indeed it was enough to catch the eye of Sam Allardyce, manager of Bolton Wanderers (Le Mans UC72 looked to sign him but administrative problems didn't allow Mbesuma to join France). However, Mbesuma was reluctant to take a trial at the club, feeling his quality was already proven, and so this allowed then-Portsmouth manager Alain Perrin to snap him up on a three-year contract in the summer of 2005. Work permit problems due to the low ranking of his country meant he was not given clearance to join the club until late into pre-season.

It was noted that he appeared overweight early in the season when playing for the reserve team. Mbesuma never started a match for Portsmouth; he only came on for a total of four brief substitute appearances, all in the first half of the 2005–06 season. In July 2006, he began a season long loan with CS Marítimo where he appeared to be regaining his form – netting in vital goals early in the season and receiving the Swan d'Or, an auspicious monthly Portuguese football award. However his form soon dipped and his goal tally climaxed at a total of just seven goals. He returned to Portsmouth in June 2007 after playing 23 games for the Portuguese team.

His transfer from Kaizer Chiefs to Portsmouth in August 2005 is one of those about which the Stevens inquiry report in June 2007 expressed concerns, because of the involvement of agent Willie McKay.

On 4 August 2007, it was announced that Bursaspor signed Mbesuma for an undisclosed amount.

On 17 September 2007, Mbesuma was fined 5000 Euros by Bursaspor for failing to return on time to his Turkish base after helping Zambia to beat South Africa in an African Cup of Nations qualifier. This kind of behaviour by Mbesuma was condemned and described as irresponsible by the Zambian FA (FAZ). Mbesuma has a long-standing reputation of poor timekeeping. This problem dates back to his time at Zambian outfit Roan United. In January 2008, Mbesuma was left off the Zambian national squad at the 2008 African Cup of Nations after being declared unfit.
On 23 May 2008, Mbesuma mutually terminated his contract with Bursaspor and signed with Mamelodi Sundowns. After an unimpressive stints at Mamelodi Sundowns and then Moroka Swallows FC his contract was terminated at the end of the June 2010. After being clubless for several months he joined Golden Arrows on 20 December 2010 for a six-month deal. He scored his first goals (a brace) against Amazulu on 16 January 2011.

On 16 August 2012, Mbesuma joined Orlando Pirates on a three-year contract, but in July 2014 moved to Mpumalanga Black Aces.

In September 2016, he became only the fifth player in the PSL-era to score 100 league goals.

Career statistics
Scores and results list Zambia's goal tally first.

Honours
Kaizer Chiefs
 Premier Soccer League: 2004–05
 Coca-Cola Cup: 2004–05
 Macufe Cup: 2005

CS Marítimo
 AF Madeira Cup: 2006–07

Mamelodi Sundowns
 Nedbank Cup: 2007–08

Moroka Swallows
 Nedbank Cup: 2008–09

Zambia
 Africa Cup of Nations: 2012

Individual
 PSL Player of the Season: 2005
 Lesley Manyathela Golden Boot: 2005, 2016

References

External links
 
 

1984 births
Living people
People from Luanshya
Zambian footballers
Zambian expatriate footballers
Zambia international footballers
2006 Africa Cup of Nations players
2010 Africa Cup of Nations players
2012 Africa Cup of Nations players
2013 Africa Cup of Nations players
Premier League players
Primeira Liga players
Süper Lig players
South African Premier Division players
National First Division players
Portsmouth F.C. players
C.S. Marítimo players
Bursaspor footballers
Kaizer Chiefs F.C. players
Association football forwards
Mamelodi Sundowns F.C. players
Orlando Pirates F.C. players
Moroka Swallows F.C. players
Lamontville Golden Arrows F.C. players
Mpumalanga Black Aces F.C. players
Highlands Park F.C. players
University of Pretoria F.C. players
Pretoria Callies F.C. players
Expatriate footballers in England
Expatriate footballers in Portugal
Expatriate footballers in Turkey
Expatriate soccer players in South Africa
Zambian expatriate sportspeople in England
Zambian expatriate sportspeople in Portugal
Zambian expatriate sportspeople in Turkey
Zambian expatriate sportspeople in South Africa
Africa Cup of Nations-winning players